Pécloz is a mountain of Savoie, France.

References

Mountains of Savoie
Mountains of the Alps